Zlatomir Zagorčić (born 15 June 1971) is a former Serbian-born Bulgarian footballer.

Nicknamed Zagi, Zagorčić played as a defender and began his career with FK Novi Sad. In 1997 he moved to Bulgarian club Litex Lovech, where he won two Bulgarian A Group titles. In this time Zagorčić made his debut for the Bulgarian national team under manager Hristo Bonev prior to the 1998 World Cup. He was a member of the Bulgarian 2004 European Football Championship squad.

Zagorčić retired from playing professional football in November 2005.

Managerial career
In July 2006 Zagorčić joined the coaching staff of his former club Litex Lovech, as he was appointed assistant to manager Ljupko Petrović. In the summer of 2013, he was appointed as manager of Litex, replacing Hristo Stoichkov, who had stepped down as head coach. He was released from his duties in late March 2014.

On 11 May 2017, Zagorčić was appointed as a manager of Slavia Sofia after the bad form of the team under Vladimir Ivanov. In May 2018, he led the team to a victory in the Bulgarian Cup, the first one in 22 years. During the 2019-20 season Slavia finished in third place in the league and qualified to the UEFA Europa League. Zagorčić parted ways with the team by mutual consent on 1 September 2020.

Honours
Litex Lovech
Bulgarian A Group (2): 1997–98, 1998–99
Bulgarian Cup: 2003–04

Manager
Slavia Sofia
Bulgarian Cup (1) 2017-18

References

External links
 
 Profile at TFF.org

1971 births
Living people
Footballers from Novi Sad
Serbian footballers
Naturalised citizens of Bulgaria
Bulgarian footballers
Bulgaria international footballers
Association football defenders
RFK Novi Sad 1921 players
PFC Litex Lovech players
Adanaspor footballers
FC Lugano players
UEFA Euro 2004 players
Serbian emigrants to Bulgaria
Swiss Super League players
First Professional Football League (Bulgaria) players
Expatriate footballers in Turkey
Expatriate footballers in Switzerland
Bulgarian football managers
FK Vojvodina managers
PFC Litex Lovech managers
PFC Slavia Sofia managers
Bulgarian people of Serbian descent